Matt Clape (born 28 May 1969) is a former Australian rules footballer who played for Carlton and West Coast in the Australian Football League.

Clape got his first chance at AFL football with the West Coast Eagles as a half back flanker but was delisted after three seasons. He was given a second chance by Carlton when they picked him in the 1995 AFL Pre-Season Draft.

In the club's premiership season of 1995, Clape featured prominently. Pushed up forward he kicked 7 straight goals and gathered 17 possessions in a round 15 game against Adelaide at Optus Oval. He played in the Grand Final and starred with 19 disposals. At the end of the year he had kicked 31 goals.

Matt is now a successful business owner living in Perth

Statistics

|-
|- style="background-color: #EAEAEA"
! scope="row" style="text-align:center" | 1992
|style="text-align:center;"|
| 32 || 9 || 4 || 2 || 73 || 38 || 111 || 25 || 18 || 0.4 || 0.2 || 8.1 || 4.2 || 12.3 || 2.8 || 2.0 || 0
|-
! scope="row" style="text-align:center" | 1993
|style="text-align:center;"|
| 32 || 14 || 8 || 8 || 65 || 49 || 114 || 18 || 10 || 0.6 || 0.6 || 4.6 || 3.5 || 8.1 || 1.3 || 0.7 || 2
|- style="background-color: #EAEAEA"
! scope="row" style="text-align:center" | 1994
|style="text-align:center;"|
| 32 || 6 || 2 || 1 || 24 || 11 || 35 || 7 || 3 || 0.3 || 0.2 || 4.0 || 1.8 || 5.8 || 1.2 || 0.5 || 0
|-
|style="text-align:center;background:#afe6ba;"|1995†
|style="text-align:center;"|
| 6 || 23 || 31 || 11 || 200 || 119 || 319 || 89 || 20 || 1.3 || 0.5 || 8.7 || 5.2 || 13.9 || 3.9 || 0.9 || 9
|- style="background-color: #EAEAEA"
! scope="row" style="text-align:center" | 1996
|style="text-align:center;"|
| 6 || 17 || 10 || 6 || 128 || 85 || 213 || 45 || 28 || 0.6 || 0.4 || 7.5 || 5.0 || 12.5 || 2.6 || 1.6 || 1
|-
! scope="row" style="text-align:center" | 1997
|style="text-align:center;"|
| 6 || 11 || 5 || 6 || 60 || 67 || 127 || 38 || 13 || 0.5 || 0.5 || 5.5 || 6.1 || 11.5 || 3.5 || 1.2 || 0
|- style="background-color: #EAEAEA"
! scope="row" style="text-align:center" | 1998
|style="text-align:center;"|
| 6 || 7 || 2 || 1 || 36 || 14 || 50 || 17 || 2 || 0.3 || 0.1 || 5.1 || 2.0 || 7.1 || 2.4 || 0.3 || 0
|- class="sortbottom"
! colspan=3| Career
! 87
! 62
! 35
! 586
! 383
! 969
! 239
! 94
! 0.7
! 0.4
! 6.7
! 4.4
! 11.1
! 2.7
! 1.1
! 12
|}

References

Holmesby, Russell and Main, Jim (2007). The Encyclopedia of AFL Footballers. 7th ed. Melbourne: Bas Publishing.

1969 births
Living people
Carlton Football Club players
Carlton Football Club Premiership players
West Coast Eagles players
East Perth Football Club players
Australian rules footballers from Western Australia
Western Australian State of Origin players
One-time VFL/AFL Premiership players